Agehachō (アゲハ蝶) (English: Swallowtail Butterfly) is the sixth single released by the Japanese pop-rock band Porno Graffitti. It was released on June 27, 2001.

Track listing

Certifications

References

2001 singles
Porno Graffitti songs
2001 songs
SME Records singles
Oricon Weekly number-one singles